The Florida Platform is a flat geological feature with the emergent portion forming the Florida peninsula.

Structure
The platform forms a rampart between the Gulf of Mexico and the Atlantic Ocean. The Florida peninsula is located on the eastern side of the platform, where in places it lies only  from the platform's edge. The western reaches of the platform just off Tampa were explored by the submersible DSV Alvin.

Geology

Basement
The platform's basement rocks include Precambrian-Cambrian igneous rocks, Ordovician-Devonian sedimentary rocks, and Triassic-Jurassic volcanic Rock.  Florida's igneous and sedimentary foundation separated from what is now the African Plate when the super-continent Pangea rifted apart in the Triassic and possibly pre-Middle Jurassic. It then secured to the North American craton. One of the early geologic structures is the Peninsular Arch which formed during the Jurassic.

Emergent portion
The oldest sediments that are exposed are Middle Eocene carbonates found in the Avon Park Formation. Most of the state of Florida is covered by Pliocene, Pleistocene, and Holocene siliciclastic-bearing sediments deposited during sea-level fluctuations and filling in of the Gulf Trough beginning in the late Tertiary and Quaternary.

Notes

External links
Geologic Map of the State of Florida 
General Facts about the Gulf of Mexico

Geology of Florida
Physical oceanography
Terranes
Landforms of the Gulf of Mexico